WTRZ (107.3 FM, "Star 107") is a radio station broadcasting an adult contemporary music format. Licensed to Spencer, Tennessee, United States, the station is currently owned by Peg Broadcasting, LLC and features programming from Citadel Media.

References

External links
 
 

Mainstream adult contemporary radio stations in the United States
TRZ
Van Buren County, Tennessee